Capetus  is an extinct genus of temnospondyl from the Upper Carboniferous of the Czech Republic. It reached a length of 150 cm.

References

Sequeira, S. E. K. & Milner, A. R. 1993. The temnospondyl amphibian Capetus from the Upper Carboniferous of the Czech Republic. Palaeontology 36, 657–680.
Steyer, J. S., Damiani, R., Sidor, C. A., O'Keefe, R., Larsson, H. C. E., Maga, A. & Ide, O. 2006. The vertebrate fauna of the Upper Permian of Niger. IV. Nigerpeton ricqlesi (Temnospondyli: Cochleosauridae), and the edopoid colonization of Gondwana. Journal of Vertebrate Paleontology 26, 18–28.

Carboniferous temnospondyls of Europe
Temnospondyls
Prehistoric amphibian genera